Whiton is an unincorporated community in Wicomico and Worcester counties in the U.S. state of Maryland.

References

Unincorporated communities in Wicomico County, Maryland
Unincorporated communities in Worcester County, Maryland
Unincorporated communities in Maryland